Minich is a surname. Notable people with the surname include:

 Angelo Minich (1817–1893), Italian pathologist and professor of surgery at the University of Padua
 Ponte Minich, a bridge in Venice
 T. J. Minich, American musician

See also
 Minch (disambiguation)
 Minick (disambiguation)
 Minnich
 Minnick
 Minik (disambiguation)